Rochenda Sandall (born  1988) is a British actress who played Lisa McQueen in Line of Duty, and has featured in other productions including Small Axe and  Doctor Who.

Biography
Rochenda Sandall was born in about 1988 in Grimsby, and grew up in Goxhill. Aged 17, she moved to London and attended the East 15 Acting School. She graduated from the Royal Academy of Dramatic Art in 2012, later making her stage debut in Scenes from an Execution at the Royal National Theatre. For the next few years she worked mainly in theatrical productions, including in Coriolanus alongside Tom Hiddleston. Meanwhile, she had roles as police officers in the television series Doctors and Coronation Street. Her monologue performance in Alan Bennett's The Outside Dog was selected by The Guardian as the best theatre show of 2020.

Sandall was a series regular in Criminal: UK, as Detective Constable Vanessa Warren. Sandall starred with Letitia Wright and John Boyega in Small Axe (2020), and also had roles in Black Mirror: Bandersnatch and in Star Wars: The Rise of Skywalker. She appeared as a high-ranking member of a criminal gang in Line of Duty, and played Azure in the 13th series of Doctor Who.

In 2020, Sandall was reported to be in a long-term relationship with fellow actor Mark Stanley, who acted with her in Criminal: UK.

References

External links
 

People from Grimsby
Alumni of RADA
Alumni of East 15 Acting School
English television actresses
English stage actresses
Year of birth missing (living people)
Living people